Areolar glands, Glands of Montgomery, Glandulae areolares, Montgomery glands, Tubercula Montgomery, or Tubercula areolae are 10-15 elevations of the areola, usually arranged in a circle around the nipple, which are often particularly visible when the nipple is erect. 

They are sebaceous glands  which produce an oily secretion to lubricate the nipple when breastfeeding. Their function is to protect the skin and provide some air tightness between the infant's mouth and the nipple. Thus, they promote adequate breast feeding of the infant. In addition, recent research suggests that they produce a type of scent (pheromone) that guides infants to food.

Structure 
Areolar glands are round bumps found in the areola, and sometimes on the nipple.

Variation 
The tubercles become more pronounced during pregnancy. The number of glands can vary greatly, usually averaging from 4 to 28 per breast.

Function 
Areolar glands make oily secretions (lipoid fluid) to keep the areola and the nipple lubricated and protected. Volatile compounds in these secretions may also serve as an olfactory stimulus for newborn appetite. They can become exposed and raised when the nipple is stimulated. The skin over the surface opening is lubricated and tends to be smoother than the rest of the areola.

Clinical significance 
Areolar glands may secrete excessive amounts of oil. This is a neutral condition that rarely represents any underlying problem, unlike galactorrhoea.

History 
Areolar glands may also be called Glands of Montgomery, or Montgomery tubercles. They are named after Dr. William Fetherstone Montgomery (1797–1859), an Irish obstetrician who first described them in 1837.

See also 
 Cracked nipple
 List of specialized glands within the human integumentary system

References 

Breast anatomy
Exocrine system
Glands
Human female endocrine system